The Vyala is a river in the southwestern part on the Kola Peninsula, Murmansk Oblast, Russia. The Vyala is a right tributary to the Umba. It flows westwards from Lake Vyalozero through a sparsely populated landscape of forests and bogs. It joins the Umba 16 km north of the Umba's outlet into the White Sea.

References

Rivers of Murmansk Oblast